International Political Science Abstracts/Documentation Politique Internationale  (IPSA) is a bimonthly peer-reviewed academic journal that covers political science. The editors-in-chief are Paul J. Godt (American University of Paris) and Serge Hutig (Fondation Nationale des Sciences Politiques). The journal was established in 1951 and is published by SAGE Publications on behalf of the International Political Science Association (IPSA).

Abstracting and indexing 
The journal is abstracted and indexed in:
 Academic Search
 International Bibliography of Periodical Literature in the Humanities and Social Sciences
 International Bibliography of the Social Sciences
 Scopus
 Sociological Abstracts
 Worldwide Political Science Abstracts

References

External links 
 

SAGE Publishing academic journals
English-language journals
Political science journals
Bimonthly journals
Publications established in 1951